Jalgaon Lok Sabha constituency is one of the 48 Lok Sabha (parliamentary) constituencies of Maharashtra state in western India.

Assembly segments
At present, (after the implementation of the Presidential notification on delimitation on 19 February 2008), Jalgaon Lok Sabha constituency comprises six Vidhan Sabha (legislative assembly) segments. These segments are:

Members of Parliament

^ - bypoll

Election results

General Elections 2019

General Elections 2014

General elections 2009

See also
 Jalgaon district
 Raver Lok Sabha constituency
 List of Constituencies of the Lok Sabha

Notes

External links
Jalgaon lok sabha  constituency election 2019 results details

Lok Sabha constituencies in Maharashtra
Jalgaon district